Tell Me You Love Me is the sixth studio album by American singer Demi Lovato. It was released on September 29, 2017, by Island, Hollywood, and Safehouse Records. The album serves as her final project to be released through Hollywood Records, with whom she released six studio albums. Primarily a pop record, the album also incorporates elements of R&B. Lovato described the album as having a more "soulful" side than her previous work, and named Christina Aguilera, Aretha Franklin, and Kehlani as its major influences. Contributions to the album's production came from several producers, including Mitch Allan, David Massey, Oak Felder, Stint, and John Hill.

Lyrically, Tell Me You Love Me explores themes of overcoming heartbreak, letting go trauma, and being single. The album's lead single "Sorry Not Sorry", released on July 11, 2017, went on to become Lovato's highest-charting single in the United States, peaking at number six on the Billboard Hot 100 and being certified 5× Platinum by the Recording Industry Association of America (RIAA). The title track was released as the album's second and final single on November 14, peaking at number 53 on the Billboard Hot 100 and later being certified double Platinum by the RIAA.

Upon its release, Tell Me You Love Me received generally favorable reviews from music critics, many of whom praised its production and Lovato's emotive vocal performance, with some deeming it her finest album to date. It peaked within the top ten in numerous countries worldwide, peaking at number three on the US Billboard 200. In support of the album, Lovato embarked on the Tell Me You Love Me World Tour in 2018. On May 7, 2021, Lovato released previous Target-edition bonus tracks "Smoke & Mirrors" and "Ready for Ya" as part of the deluxe version of the album.

Recording and development
Following the release of her fifth studio album Confident in October 2015, Lovato told Latina that her follow-up album would have a "more soulful vibe". In October 2016, she announced via Twitter that she would be taking a break from music and the spotlight in 2017, stating "I'm not meant for this business or the media". However, she revealed to Mike Adam in August 2017 that after doing charity work earlier that year, she felt rejuvenated and started creating music again, which eventually led to an album. The singer mentioned that a title and release date had been chosen, but she was not allowed to disclose them at the time.

Lovato also told MTV News that month she was influenced by many artists for Tell Me You Love Me, including Aretha Franklin, Christina Aguilera, and Kehlani. She stated that the album was heavily inspired by Aguilera's album Stripped, calling it "a breakout album that really transformed her into the icon that she is today". Lovato stated that she worked with producers Pharrell Williams and Mike Will Made It, but their work would not be featured on the album.

Release and promotion

On August 23, 2017, Lovato posted an 18-second video to her official Twitter account. In the video, she's seen singing the title track, "Tell Me You Love Me", in a recording studio. As the camera pans out, the footage appears to be reflected on Lovato's eye while zooming further back and unveiling the standard edition album cover; a black and white close-up photo of her face with the album title underneath. The album cover is then dimmed, to reveal the release date of September 29, 2017. Along with the video and release date, Lovato also announced that the album would be available for pre-order at midnight on August 24, 2017. On September 13, 2017, Lovato unveiled the tracklist with help from her fans on Twitter.

On September 29, 2017, Lovato celebrated the album by hosting a live stream event with Vevo, where she discussed the album and delivered acoustic performances of "Sorry Not Sorry" and "Tell Me You Love Me". Lovato also partnered with audio electronics company JBL to host a pop-up exhibition in New York City, showcasing the album's editorial photography and custom murals inspired by the album, created by contemporary painter Lora Zombie.

On October 26, 2017, Lovato announced she was going on tour. The tour started in San Diego on February 26, 2018 and concluded on July 22, 2018, in Paso Robles. DJ Khaled and Kehlani were announced as opening acts on the first North American leg of the tour. Jax Jones and Joy were announced as opening acts on the European leg. Iggy Azalea and Lauv were set to perform as opening acts on the second North American leg of the tour, in which one of the shows was cancelled, leaving Azalea as the only opening act on the leg. Becky G and Jorge Blanco were announced as opening acts on the Latin America leg of the tour, which was later canceled due to health issues.

Music and lyrics
For Tell Me You Love Me, Lovato adopted R&B as a key to achieve her desired "mature" sound. According to her, she wanted to make sure that this "album showcased her voice." On the other hand, she also deemed Tell Me You Love Me a "soulful" record, as she explained to Time magazine, its sonority serves as a real representation of who she was artistically and personally at that moment. Stephen Thomas Erlewine from AllMusic perceived, although there are ghosts of traditional soul threaded through the record, "the production is firmly modern, filled with electronic flair and allusions to hip-hop rhythms." Having an electronic production, the album opens with the lead single "Sorry Not Sorry", which contains several synthesized effects such as handclaps, finger snaps, a distorted bass voice and club synths. These effects are intercepted with a heavy bassline, hip hop beats, minimal piano notes and backing chants. Elias Leight of Rolling Stone noted that Lovato expands to fill the track's empty space by "belting her non-apology with the vindictive force of someone who knows their actions are justified." According to the singer, "Sorry Not Sorry" is a song for the "haters" with the message "You know what? I'm good now, and sorry I'm not sorry that you may not be loving where your life is at the moment."

The title track is a gospel-influenced song described as a "booming ballad" by Fuse's Jeff Benjamin. It is instrumentally complete with horns, percussive drums, handclaps and wah-wah guitar lines. Lovato explained to Billboard that "Tell Me You Love Me" is about "the vulnerability of coming out of a very serious relationship and having a tough time with it," and further commented that lines as "You ain't nobody 'til you got somebody," "calls out a big misconception." Exhibiting influences from 1980s and 1990s musical styles, the third track "Sexy Dirty Love" has an uptempo danceable rhythm that blends funk and disco as well as "old-school" R&B and electro genres. Due to its sonority, Mike Wass from Idolator associated the track with Justin Timberlake's FutureSex/LoveSounds album. Lyrically, it narrates a thoroughly modern romantic encounter initiated via web with Lovato singing about fantasy through the phone in the first verse. Composed in a compound time signature, "You Don't Do It for Me Anymore" features a slow tempo subdued beat and strings chords. During the song, Lovato uses her higher vocal register in a crescendo. Rob Arcand of Billboard praised her vocal range, writing it reaches "near-Adele limits in melisma and virtuosity." The lyrics reflect about a past situation in a negative relationship with an abusive partner with the singer expressing that its presence is not as necessary as before. Although it's written in a perspective of an ended relationship, Lovato explained that the song is a look back at her personal struggles and addictions, saying: "I sang [it] with a lot of emotion because it reminded me of my relationship with my old self that I don't relate to anymore."

The electronic song "Daddy Issues" sees Lovato singing about a torrid affair with an older man explaining that she has some issues and certain behaviors caused by her relationship with her father. In an interview with BBC News, the singer confessed that the lyrics were ones she came up with, based on her own experiences. Mike Nied from Idolator observed that in the track Lovato "is hooked on some good loving, and she is content to keep things casual." Its synthpop production contains heavy stuttering synth drops and keyboard effects. In "Ruin the Friendship", Lovato invites a special friend to take their relationship to a romantic level, appreciating his appearance and confessing her sexual intentions with him. During the verses, she sings accompanied by a bass guitar and a tenor saxophone. With a melodic horn section during the chorus, the song features and contains a smooth, slow-burn atmosphere reminiscent of jazz music. Its sound also demonstrates influences from traditional rhythm and blues. "Only Forever" is a melancholic song about wanting the person you want to explore a new relationship with to make that first move or take that next step. With a message of "giving someone chances that will last a lifetime," Lovato considered "Only Forever" as a sequel to "Ruin the Friendship". The song also has a connection with her personal experiences, and was used in a sequence of ad campaigns for the fashion brand Dior, promoting the brands "Dior Forever" makeup collection. Throughout the track, Lovato's vocals appear to be echoing over a minimal bassline. "Lonely" is a duet with rapper Lil Wayne that finds Lovato as a protagonist expressing angriness and disappointment about the behavior of an abusive partner with Wayne's verses reiterating these feelings. Its production, handled by DJ Mustard, features sparse, ambient synths in contrasts with a trap-inflected minimalist beat.

A downtempo ballad with influences from rock n' roll music, "Cry Baby" makes use of a pounding piano, snare and bass drums, and electric guitar riff slides. Lyrically, "Cry Baby" shows Lovato singing about experiencing a dramatic romantic situation that alternates her solid personality, making her a fragile person. As she sings in the chorus, although her heart is the "hardest to break", a romantic interest made her cry and feel heartbroken. According to Lovato, "Games" is about "playing games when she got out of a relationship and started dating again." As Alexia Camp of Slant Magazine commented, it finds Lovato "giving as good as she gets when her object of affection sends mixed (text) messages." The track was also noted for containing an instrumentation reminiscent of trap music. "Concentrate" and "Hitchhiker" are midtempo numbers, where the usage of guitar is a predominant characteristic in her production. The former is a stripped-down song with the lyrics focusing on sexual themes as Lovato's lust for her lover has her extremely distracted. Idolator's Mike Wass noted that Lovato "straddles the line between explicit and almost spiritual, but she manages to make the effort all about making love instead of rolling around in the sack with a fling." Tell Me You Love Mes twelfth track, "Hitchhiker", is an optimistic love song about taking an emotional leap with a stranger.

Singles
"Sorry Not Sorry" was released as the lead single from the record on July 11, 2017. It was written by Demi Lovato, Oak Felder, Sean Douglas, Trevor Brown and William Zaire Simmons. It was produced by Oak Felder, Trevor Brown and William Zaire Simmons. The song peaked at number six on the US Billboard Hot 100, and became her highest charting single there.

The album's title track "Tell Me You Love Me" was released as the first promotional single from the album along with the pre-order on August 24, 2017. The song was released as the second and final single from the album on November 14, 2017. After being released as a single, the song debuted and later peaked at number 53 on the Billboard Hot 100.

Promotional singles
"You Don't Do It for Me Anymore" was released as the second promotional single from the album on September 8, 2017. The track sold 12,757 copies in its first week of release.

The third promotional single, "Sexy Dirty Love" was released on September 22, 2017. The track sold 8,486 copies in its first week of release.

Critical reception

Tell Me You Love Me received generally positive reviews from music critics. On Metacritic, which assigns a normalized rating out of 100 to reviews from mainstream critics, the album received an average score of 72 based on six reviews, indicating "generally favorable reviews". Album of the Year assessed the critical consensus as a 65 out of 100, based on 35 reviews.

For Pitchfork, Jamieson Cox stated that Lovato "has finally settled into a consistently compelling space: flinty, flirty R&B that's just as thrilling hushed as it is at full blast", and noticed the improvement over her previous works: "It gives you enough space to see Demi as something other than a no-holds-barred belter. You want to get to know the Lovato behind Tell Me You Love Me, something you can't definitively say about any of her other releases". Stephen Thomas Erlewine of AllMusic wrote that the album "runs the gamut from churchy soul to seductive slow-burners to showstopping ballads designed to showcase every single one of Lovato's diva moves", giving the album 3.5 out of 5 stars. The Herald Sun rated the album 3.5 out of 4 stars, deeming it "impressive" and felt "Daddy Issues" was the best track. Writing for Idolator, Mike Nied gave the record 4 stars out of 5 and stated that "Demi finally hits her stride" with the album. He added that "instead of sprinkling one or two hits among a lot of filler, the hitmaker has finally recruited the right team and found her voice over sparkling mid-tempos and frenetic bangers. The album has the distinction of being [Lovato's] most cohesive and is one of the strongest to drop in 2017" and compared the album to Christina Aguilera's Stripped.

In a positive review, Aidin Vaziri of the San Francisco Chronicle wrote that Lovato "feels jilted, and conjuring the battle cries of pop predecessors like Christina Aguilera and Kelly Clarkson, [Lovato] unleashes on exes and backstabbing friends with the kind of vocal firepower best appreciated from a safe distance". Los Angeles Times writer Mikael Wood praised the album's tracks as "catchy and funny and sexy and daring", and wrote that Tell Me You Love Me "presents a singer burning with purpose". For Entertainment Weeklys editor Tim Snatc, Tell Me You Love Me "suffers for some of its excessive vocal fireworks." Giving the album a B rating, he felt that the best parts of the album are "on the first half and showcase Lovato's swagger, especially the standout gospel-tinged title track." Writing for Rolling Stone, Maura Johnston stated the album "gets bogged down" in chilled-out trap pop. She later commented slow-tempo tracks like "Concentrate" balanced the downtempo and the energetic tracks.

On December 4, 2017, Time ranked the best albums of 2017, and gave an honorable mention to the album, noting "Lovato's full-throated pop on Tell Me You Love Me" and acclaiming Lovato for "stepping outside of comfort zones and creating new pathways for music to follow".

In 2022, Consequence of Sounds Mary Siroky included Tell Me You Love Me on her list of favorite pop albums in the last 15 years.

Year-end lists

Commercial performance
In the United Kingdom, Tell Me You Love Me debuted at number five on the UK Albums Chart, becoming her highest charting album in the nation at that time. The record entered at number eight in Australia, becoming her second top 10 album on the ARIA Albums Chart after Confident reached number three. The album opened at number three on the US Billboard 200 with 74,000 album-equivalent units, which consisted of 48,000 pure sales, and became her sixth consecutive top five entry on the chart after all five of her previous studio efforts charted within that range. In Canada, it arrived at number 4 and became her fifth consecutive album to reach the country's top five. In August 2018, the record was certified Platinum in the US, becoming Lovato's first album to reach this milestone.

Track listingNotes'''
 signifies an additional producer
 signifies a co-producer
 signifies a vocal producer
 signifies an additional vocal producer

Personnel
Credits adapted from the liner notes of Tell Me You Love Me''.

Performers and musicians

 Demi Lovato – lead vocals
 Lil Wayne – featured artist (track 8)
 Stefflon Don – featured artist (track 13)
 Jax Jones – featured artist (track 13)
 Cheat Codes – featured artist (track 15)
 Jonathan Asperil – electric guitar (track 14)
 Laurhan Beato – alto (track 14)
 Nelson Beato – tenor (track 14)
 Daro Behroozi – tenor saxophone (track 6)
 "Downtown" Trevor Brown – additional vocals (track 3)
 Carl L. Carter – percussion (track 14), drums (track 14)
 Deonis "Pumah" Cook – tenor (track 14)
 Charity "CherryD" Davis – background vocals (track 14)
 Quishima Dixon – alto (track 14)
 Sean Douglas – background vocals (track 1)
 Thomas Drayton – bass (tracks 11–12)
 Warren "Oak" Felder – keyboards (tracks 1, 3), additional vocals (track 3), synthesizer (tracks 3, 5), acoustic guitar (track 5)
 Joshua Gawel – trumpet (track 6)
 John Hill – drums (track 2), bass (track 2), guitar (track 2), horn (track 2), piano (track 2)
 Kevin Hissink – guitars (track 9), bass (track 9)
Jonas Jeberg – all instruments (track 4)
 Jax Jones – drums (track 13), synths (track 13)
 Zaire Koalo – additional vocals (tracks 1, 3)
 Kirby Lauryen – background vocals (track 2)
 Ayani Layli – background vocals (track 14)
 MNEK – background vocals (track 13)
 Dave Palmer – keyboards (track 2)
 Bennett Paysinger – Hammond B3 (track 14)
 Andrew Portes – bass (track 6)
 Lenny "The Ox" Reece – drums (track 6)
 Steven "Styles" Rodriguez – piano (track 14), Fender Rhodes (track 14), Hammond B3 (track 14), electric guitar (track 14)
 Whitney Rollins – soprano (track 14)
 Adam Ross – acoustic guitar (track 14)
 Sermstyle – keyboards (track 9)
 Sir Nolan – all instrumentation (track 17)
 Stint – drums (track 2), bass (track 2), guitar (track 2), horn (track 2), piano (track 2)
 Adam Tressler – guitar (tracks 11–12)
 Danielle Withers – soprano (track 14)
 Ido Zmishlany – guitar (track 6), keyboards (track 6), percussion (track 6), piano (track 6)

Production

 Sarah Aarons – production (track 16), recording (track 16)
 Ben Abraham – production (track 16), recording (track 16)
 Mitch Allan – vocal production (tracks 4, 8, 11–12, 15–16), engineering (tracks 2, 4, 15)
 Jose Balaguer – engineering (track 1), vocal recording (track 4)
 Matt Bang – recording (track 6)
 "Downtown" Trevor Brown – co-production (tracks 1, 3, 10), programming (tracks 1, 3), synthesizer programming (tracks 1, 3, 10)
 Zach Brown – assistant recording (track 6)
 Cheat Codes – recording (track 15)
 Rob Cohen – engineering (track 2), recording and editing (track 2)
 Miles Comasky – assistant mix engineer (track 6)
 Serge Courtois – mixing (track 17)
 Trevor Dahl – production (track 15), programming (track 15)
 Scott Desmarais – mixing assistant (track 1)
 DJ Mustard – production (track 8)
 Eric J Dubowsky – mixing (track 5)
 Oak Felder – production (tracks 1, 3, 5, 7, 10), programming (tracks 1, 5, 7, 10), additional recording (track 1), keyboards arrangement (tracks 1, 3), recording (tracks 3, 5, 7, 10), synthesizer programming (tracks 1, 10)
 Mike Fennel – recording (track 6)
 Robin Florent – mixing assistant (track 1)
 Jackson Foote – production (track 15), programming (track 15)
 Tom AD Fuller – assistant engineering (track 13)
 Chris Galland – mixing engineering (track 1)
 Manny Galvez – vocal recording (track 8)
 Chris Gehringer – mastering
 Serban Ghenea – mixing (tracks 2, 15)
 Martin Gray – assistant recording (track 6)
 John Hanes – engineered for mix (tracks 2, 15)
 Stuart Hawkes – mastering (track 13)
 John Hill – production (track 2), programming (track 2)
 Kevin Hissink – co-production (track 9), recording (tracks 9, 11–12)
 Jonas Jeberg – production (track 4), engineering (track 4), recording (track 4)
 Chantry Johnson – vocal recording (tracks 11–12, 16)
 Jax Jones – production (track 13), programming (track 13), drums programming (track 13), synth programming (track 13), recording arrangement (track 13)
 Jaycen Joshua – mixing (track 8)
 Zaire Koalo – co-production (tracks 1, 3, 5, 10), drums programming (tracks 1, 3, 5, 10)
 Anton Kuhl – production (track 4)
 Ari Leff – production (track 15), programming (track 15)
 Nicole "Coco" Llorens – assistant engineering (track 1), assistant (track 4), recording (track 6)
 Erik Madrid – mixing (tracks 3–4, 7, 9–12)
 Manny Marroquin – mixing (track 1)
 Tony Maserati – mixing (track 6)
 Zeke Mishanec – vocal recording (tracks 2, 8)
 Taylor Parks – vocal production (track 9)
 Will Quinnell – mastering
 Mark Ralph – production (track 13), mixing (track 13)
 Scott Robinson – additional vocal production (tracks 4, 8, 11–12)
 Rush Hr. – production (tracks 11–12)
 Sermstyle – production (track 9)
 Sir Nolan – production (track 17), recording (track 17), programming (track 17)
 Keith "Daquan" Sorrells – assistant engineering (tracks 1, 3, 5, 7, 10)
 Alex Spencer – assistant mixing (tracks 3, 7, 9–12)
 Stint – production (track 2), programming (track 2)
 Oli Straus – recording (track 6)
 Drew Smith – engineering (track 13)
 Jaime Velez – vocals recording (track 9)
 Tim Watt – assistant mixing (track 5)
 Nolan Westcott – recording (track 6)
 Ido Zmishlany – production (track 6), recording (track 6), programming (track 6)

Design

 Sandra Brummels – art direction
 Alberto Erazo – art direction, design
 Kyledidthis – art direction, design
 Dennis Leupold – photography
 David Massey – executive producer
 Andy Proctor – package production

Charts

Weekly charts

Monthly charts

Year-end charts

Certifications

Release history

References

2017 albums
Demi Lovato albums
Hollywood Records albums
Island Records albums
Safehouse Records albums
Albums produced by DJ Mustard
Albums produced by John Hill (record producer)
Albums recorded at A&M Studios
Albums recorded at Westlake Recording Studios
Albums produced by Oak Felder